The Swiss Conspiracy is a 1976 action film directed by Jack Arnold and starring David Janssen, Senta Berger and Elke Sommer. It was co-produced between West Germany and the United States.

Plot
A Swiss bank learns that the confidentiality of several anonymous numbered accounts has been compromised and blackmail threats have been made to five holders of the accounts. They include a crooked arms dealer, who received a demand for five million Swiss francs. He refuses to pay and is shot dead. The bank is also told to pay ten million francs to keep the accounts secret.

The bank hires David Christopher (Janssen), a former U.S. Treasury official who now resides in Geneva. In the course of his investigation, Christopher talks to the four living blackmailees - beautiful Zürich resident Denise Abbott (Berger), Texas businessman Dwight McGowan (John Ireland), Chicago crook Robert Hayes (John Saxon) and Dutchman Andre Kosta (Arthur Brauss).

He identifies a number of suspects. One is Rita Jensen (Sommer), the mistress of the bank's vice-president, Franz Benninger (Anton Diffring). There is also Benninger himself as well as Korsak (Curt Lowens) and Sando (David Hess), who are out to kill Hayes and Christopher.

Bank president Johann Hurtil (Ray Milland) cannot believe that Benninger is corrupt. However, it emerges that the latter transferred control of a bank account to his mistress, who was legally entitled to it but didn't have the correct documents.

Captain Hans Frey (Inigo Gallo) of the Swiss Federal Police is suspicious of Christopher's activities and follows him.

The bank decides to pay the blackmailer, using uncut diamonds. Christopher insists on accompanying the diamonds to the collection point high in the snow-covered Alps. The blackmailees turn out to be blackmailing each other and the collector of the diamonds is shot, falling off a high alpine rock face. Christopher recovers the stones.

Cast

 David Janssen as David Christopher
 Senta Berger as Denise Abbott
 John Ireland as Dwight McGowan
 John Saxon as Robert Hayes
 Ray Milland as Johann Hurtil
 Elke Sommer as Rita Jensen
 Anton Diffring as Franz Benninger
 Arthur Brauss as Andre Kosta 
 Inigo Gallo as Captain Frey
 Curt Lowens as Korsak

Production
Though burdened by a poor soundtrack and many obvious James Bond-esque gimmicks, the film is notable for beautiful scenery, being filmed entirely in and around Zurich.

External links
 The Swiss Conspiracy Web Page
 The Swiss Conspiracy MySpace Page
 

1976 films
1976 action films
American detective films
West German films
Films directed by Jack Arnold
Films scored by Klaus Doldinger
Films set in Switzerland
English-language German films
1970s English-language films
1970s American films